National Route 253 is a national highway of Japan connecting Jōetsu, Niigata and Minamiuonuma, Niigata in Japan, with a total length of 67.8 km (42.13 mi).

References

National highways in Japan
Roads in Niigata Prefecture